Antonio Francisco Navas Vargas (born 13 February 1995) is a Spanish footballer who plays for Atlético Sanluqueño CF as a right back.

Club career
Born in El Ejido, Almería, Andalusia, Navas represented Polideportivo Ejido and Real Betis as a youth. In January 2013 he moved to Recreativo de Huelva, being assigned to the reserves in Tercera División.

Navas made his senior debut on 16 February 2013, coming on as a second-half substitute in a 0–4 home loss against CD Mairena. In August 2016 he moved to another reserve team, UD Almería B also in the fourth division.

On 6 September 2016 Navas made his first team debut, replacing Isidoro in a 0–2 Copa del Rey home loss against Rayo Vallecano. He scored his first senior goal on 6 November, in a 3–0 away win against Vélez CF.

Navas made his Segunda División debut on 13 January 2018, starting in a 1–1 home draw against Gimnàstic de Tarragona. On 20 August of the following year, he signed a one-year contract with Atlético Sanluqueño CF in division three, after his contract with the Rojiblancos expired.

References

External links

1995 births
Living people
Sportspeople from the Province of Almería
Spanish footballers
Footballers from Andalusia
Association football defenders
Segunda División players
Segunda División B players
Tercera División players
Atlético Onubense players
Recreativo de Huelva players
UD Almería B players
UD Almería players
Atlético Sanluqueño CF players
Real Murcia players